The Federation of American Hospitals is a trade association for tax-paying hospitals in the United States. It is based in Washington D.C. As of 2009 it was headed by "Chip" Kahn.

See also
List of industry trade groups in the United States
Health care in the United States
Lists of hospitals in the United States
American Hospital Association

References

External links
Home Page at Archive.org

Health industry trade groups based in the United States